PT Auto Euro Indonesia was a joint venture between Renault S.A. and the PT Indomobil Group for the assembly and distribution of cars for the local market. It was founded in 2001 and is located in Jakarta, Indonesia. It was succeeded by Maxindo Renaut Indonesia.

The company had assembled several models, such as Renault Mégane and Renaut Duster.

References

External links
Official Renault Indonesia website

Car manufacturers of Indonesia
Renault
Manufacturing companies based in Jakarta
Vehicle manufacturing companies established in 2001
Indonesian companies established in 2001
2019 disestablishments in Indonesia

de:IndoMobil Group#Auto Euro Indonesia, PT.